St. Vincent Bay or Saint Vincent Bay may refer to:

 St. Vincent Bay, British Columbia
 Saint Vincent Bay, New Caledonia